Julian Frederick "Fred" Howard was an English professional footballer of the 1920s.

Born in Long Eaton, he joined Gillingham from Derby County in 1920 and went on to make 18 appearances for the club in The Football League, scoring three goals. He left to join Ayr United in 1922.

References

Year of birth missing
Year of death missing
English footballers
People from Long Eaton
Footballers from Derbyshire
Gillingham F.C. players
Derby County F.C. players
Ayr United F.C. players
Association football forwards